

FC Utrecht in European Competition

This is the list of all FC Utrecht's European matches.

Overall record
Accurate as of 1 August 2019

Source: UEFA.comPld = Matches played; W = Matches won; D = Matches drawn; L = Matches lost; GF = Goals for; GA = Goals against; GD = Goal Difference. Defunct competitions indicated in italics.

Results

UEFA club coefficient ranking

Current
As of 06.07.2017, Source:

Rankings since 2006

Source:

2008–2017

Club record by club

Statistics accurate as of the last match played against Zrinjski Mostar on 1 August 2019.

References

FC Utrecht
Dutch football clubs in international competitions